John Fitzgerald Sullivan (born January 6, 1985) is a former American football placekicker who played college football at the University of New Mexico and attended Tehachapi High School in Tehachapi, California. He transferred to the University of New Mexico in the spring of 2004 from San Jose State University, where he did not play any games. He earned the starting placekicker job for the New Mexico Lobos his senior year in 2007 and was a consensus All-American. Sullivan led all of Division I in field goals made in 2007. He led Division I with a 2.42 field goals per game average, the highest total since 1984. He also made a school record 18 straight field goals.

References

External links
NFL Draft Scout

Living people
1985 births
Players of American football from California
American football placekickers
New Mexico Lobos football players
All-American college football players
Sportspeople from Fullerton, California